José-Carlos Mariátegui is a scientist, writer, curator and scholar on culture, new media and technology. Born in 1975, he is the son of Peruvian psychiatrist Javier Mariategui and the grandson of Jose Carlos Mariategui, the most influential Latin American Marxist thinker of the 20th century.  He studied Mathematics and Biology at Cayetano Heredia University in Lima, Perú and did both Masters and Doctoral degrees in Information Systems and Innovation from the London School of Economics and Political Science – LSE (London). His PhD, dated 2013, was titled Image, information and changing work practices: the case of the BBC’s Digital Media Initiative. Has been involved in teaching and research activities, as well as published a variety of articles on art, science, technology, society and development. He founded Alta Tecnología Andina (ATA), non-profit organization dedicated to the development and research of artistic and scientific theories in Latin America. Founder of the International Festival of Video and Electronic Art in Lima (1998–2003). Founding Director of the Memorial Museum of José Carlos Mariátegui of the Ministry of Culture in Peru.

For many years he worked with Gianni Toti and collaborated in Tupac Amauta, Toti's last series of works while being both residents at the CICV Centre de Recherche Pierre Schaeffer Montbéliard Belfort (France, 1997–2002). While studying in Lima, he was a member of the Scientific Thought and Philosophy of Science Program, Cayetano Heredia University (Lima, 1995–2001).  Teaches the course: “The virtual museum” at Ricardo Palma University Postgraduate Museology Program.  Member of the National Commission of Culture, a High Level dependency of the President that proposed the cultural and scientific policy in Peru (2001–2002). Recent conferences include: Coloquio Internacional de Historia del Arte “Arte y ciencia” (UNAM, Guadalajara, 2000), Medi@terra Festival (Athens, 2000), ISEA 2000 Symposium (Paris, 2000), Emoçao art.ficial (São Paulo, 2002, 2004), Transmediale.03 (Berlin, 2003), Ars Electronica (Linz, 2004). Member of the Cultural Diversity Committee of the Inter-Society for Electronic Arts (ISEA). Jury member of the 13 Videobrasil (2001), Videoformes (2003) and the Central America Videoprize (2004).

Has acted as member of the International Programming Committee (IPC) of ISEA 2002 (Japan) and of the International Advisory Board of Prix Ars Electronica 2004–2007. Corresponding Editor Leonardo Electronic Almanac.  Acted as a node of Tester and as an ISEA 2006 Pacific Rim New Media Summit International Steering Committee member. Along with geneticist and art critic Jorge Villacorta started Escuelab, an advanced research center for research and innovation for Latin America. He was a member of the Advisory Council of Third Text (2007–2012). He is currently a Network Committee member of the Prince Claus Fund (The Netherlands) and an Editorial Board member for the Leonardo Book Series at MIT Press.

Since 2010 is co-Director of the Diploma of Digital Strategies on Marketing at the Postgraduate School of the Universidad del Pacífico in Lima (Estrategias Digitales para la Gestión del Marketing).  He is also a researcher at the LSE Department of Management's Information Systems and Innovation Group and conducted research on the implementation of BBC's Digital Media Initiative (DMI) by studying digital video as an image-based artefact in both news and long-form productions, working with Prof. Jannis Kallinikos. Lives in London and Lima.

Selected publications
 “Global Spots: Perú”, Careers in Multimedia (ed. vivid studios) Ziff-Davis Press, California, 1995, pp. 66–75.
 “Techno-revolution: False evolution?”, Third Text, n. 47 (Editor: Sean Cubitt), London, 1999, pp. 71–76.
 “Zur elektronischen Videokunst in Peru”, Fortbildungsseminar “Medienkunst” des Goethe-Insituts am Zentrüm für Kunst und Medientechnologie ZKM, Karlsruhe, 2000, pp. 150–154.
 “The Camera as an Interface: Closed-Circuit Video Projects in Peru” Leonardo Electronic Almanac, Vol. 10, num. 3, March 2002.
 “Peruvian Video/Electronic Art” En: Leonardo Gallery, Leonardo Journal, Vol. 35, No. 4, pp. 335–363, MIT Press, 2002.
 “Lebende und optische Maschinen – Eine Interpretation von zwei installationen” in “Rosa Barba: off sites”, Verlag del Buchlandlung Walther Köning, Köln, 2003.
 “Roger Atasi/Francesco Mariotti: deux génerations/une historie brève” En: “Turbulences vidéo”, revue trimestrielle # 39, France, April, 2003, pp. 18–21.
 “Creadores y Nuevas Tecnologias.  Una breve historia del arte electrónico en America Latina” In: Cuaderno Central Arte Digital, Telos (Journal of Communications, technology and society), July–September 2003, No 56, Madrid, 2003.
 “Sobre o futuro da arte e da ciência através da inventividade humana” In: Arte e Vida no seculo XXI: tecnologia, ciência y creatividade” (org. Diana Dominguez), Editora UNESP, Sao Paulo, 2003, pp. 159–166
 “Video-Arte-Electrónico en Peru 2.0” In: “Perú/Video/Arte/Electrónico: memorias del festival internacional de video/arte/electronica” (ed. José-Carlos Mariátegui), Lima, 2004, pp. 10 – 25.
 “Lateinamerikanische Medienkunst: Lokale Produktion/Gobale Artikulation” In: “Bandbreite. Medien zwischen Kunst und Politik”, (eds. Andreas Broeckmann y Rudolf Frieling), Kulturverlag Kadmos, Berlin, 2004, pp. 113–120
 “Progress Revisited: Biology meets Humanity (Again)” In: Timeshift (eds. Gerfried Stocker y Christine Schöpf), Hatje Cantz, 2004, pp. 18–19.
 “Video art days. An intense decade of video art in Peru”, In ‘Latin-American Video Art: A Critical View’ (editor: L. Baigorri), Brumaria, Madrid, 2008.
 “Social Formations of Global Media Art” (con S. Cubitt, G. Nadarajan), Third Text, Volume 23, Issue 3 (MEDIA ARTS: Practice, Institutions and Histories), London, 2009.
 "Video as Digital Object: Production and Distribution of Video Content in the Internet Media Ecosystem." (with Jannis Kallinikos), The Information Society 27(5), 2011.
 “El aparato dialéctico: entre los soportes electrónicos y la expansión eletrónica del arte”. En: Jiménez, José, (ed.) Una teoría del arte desde América Latina. Turner, Madrid, 2011.
 “Disruptive, Expandable and Planetarian:Technology in Arts and Culture in Latin America”. Amsterdam, Prince Claus Fund, 2012.
 “Art and Artificial Life in Latin America: from historical legacy to contemporary influence” In: Arte y Vida Artificial: VIDA 1999-2012. K. Ohlenschläger. Madrid, Fundación Telefónica, 2012.
 “De Vestigios Tecnológicos a Objetos Digitales: una aproximación a la obra de Daniel Canogar a partir de la serie “Quadratura”. Daniel Canogar "Quadratura". Fundación Telefónica. Lima, 2014.
 "De/contextualizing Information: The Digitization of Video Editing Practices at the BBC." (with A. Marton) The information Society, special issue "Regimes of Information and the Paradox of Embeddedness" 31(2): 106-120, 2015.
 "Constructing a Socioplanetary Fabric: Fragmented Images and the (Re)constitution of Materiality in the Work of Elena Damiani." In: Elena Damiani: Sediments: An Assemblage of Remains, edited by Ekaterina Álvarez Romero, 58-63. Mexico, DF: MUAC • Museo Universitario Arte Contemporáneo, UNAM, 2015.
 “In search for transdisciplinary models of creation in Latin America. The Case of Escuelab”. NMC Media-N | Journal of the New Media Caucus 12 (1). Primavera 2016.
 Hacia una ontología del video. Ansible(4), 41-53, 2017.
 Mariátegui, emprendedor y formador de redes socio-culturales. En: D. Amaya & M. Delgado (Eds.), La página blanca entre el signo y el latido: La edición del libro literario (1920-1970) (pp. 30–35). Lima: Casa de la Literatura Peruana, 2017.
 “Recreando artefactos digitales: del archivo de ATA a la curaduría de metadATA” (with N. Montes). ILLAPA Revista del Insituto de Investigaciones Museológicas y Artísticas de la Universidad Ricardo Palma, 14, 130-141, 2017.
 “Art is Social: A Path to the New Technological Culture in Latin America." In: Latin American Modernisms and Technology, edited by María Fernández, 2019.
 “Uncovering information systems in the work of Teresa Burga” en: Retracing Political Dimensions: Strategies in Contemporary New Media Art”, Oliver Grau/Inge Hinterwaldner (Ed.), 2020.
 Archivos video-imaginados: tácticas y condiciones de los acervos de video arte en América Latina, Getty Publications, 2020.
 Mariátegui, las políticas culturales y la agencia cultural (with Víctor Vich), 2020.

Selected curatorial projects
 Nueva/Vista: Videokunst aus Lateinamerika ifa-Galerie Bonn, Berlin, Stuttgart, 2002 – 2003.
 World Wide Video Festival, Amsterdam, 8 – 25 of May, 2003.
 Via Satellite: Panorama de la Fotografía y el Video en el Perú Contemporáneo Centro Cultural de España en Lima, Montevideo, Buenos Aires, México y Santiago, 2004 – 2007.
 "Videografías In(visibles): a selection of video art from Latin-America 2000 – 2005" (with Jorge Villacorta) "Museo Patio Herreriano, Centro Atlántico de Arte Contemporáneo, España  (and touring around Latin America), 2005-2009.
 "Emergentes: 10 projects from Latin-American artists / Works in process", LABoral Centro de Arte y Creación Industrial, Gijón, co-produced with Telefonica Foundation  (and touring around Latin America), 2008.
 “Video XXI: LeMaitre Collection”, Fundación Telefónica and Museo de Arte de Lima (MALI), 2010.
 9th Shanghai Biennale "Reactivation" / Inter-city Pavilions Project, Shanghai, 2012.  Lima Pavilion “José Carlos Martinat: All the Republic in One (Stereoreality environment 12)”, (also exhibited at “City Centre: Diankou, Lima, Palermo”, organized by ArthubAsia and the Gervasuti Foundation, 55th Venice biennale, 2013).
 Zero to Infinity”, installation by Rasheed Araeen, Museo de Arte de Lima (MALI), Parques Zonales “Huáscar” (Villa El Salvador), “Huiracocha” (San Juan de Lurigancho) y “Cápac Yupanqui” (Rímac), Lima, 2013.
 “Performativity of Presence” y “Printed Cinema#14 - Subconscious Society) by Rosa Barba, Moving Image Biennale – BIM 2014, Universidad Nacional de Tres de Febrero, Buenos Aires, 2014.
 "POETRÓNICO: Gianni Toti y los orígenes de la video poesía", Museo de Arte Contemporáneo (MAC) and Casa de la Literatura, Lima, 2015-2016.
 "metadATA 20 años de cultura, arte y tecnología" (with Jorge Villacorta, Nataly Montes y Reina Jara), Centro Cultural Ricardo Palma, Lima, 2016.
 Spider by Marco Pando (with Elisa Arca), Moving Image Biennale – BIM 2016, Universidad Nacional de Tres de Febrero, Buenos Aires, 2016.
 Quàntica, an exhibition on art and physics at CCCB, Barcelona. From April to September, 2019. Co-curated with Monica Bello (art historian). The exhibition Quantum gives us the keys to understanding the principles of Quantum physics, and it does so through the joint creative work of scientists and artists. The project invites the public to browse freely, to awaken their curiosity, and to critically evaluate the new paradigms of modern science.
 *Broken Symmetries, at FACT, Liverpool. November 2018- March 2019. A touring exhibition featuring ten art projects resulting from Arts at CERN's Collide International in collaboration with FACT, Liverpool. Touring to Barcelona, Brussels, Taichung, Tallinn and Nantes as 'Quantica/ Quantum', from 2019-2021. Co-curated with Monica Bello (art historian). List of artists: Julieta Aranda, Dianne Bauer, James Bridle, Juan Cortés, Jack Jelfs and Haroon Mirza, Yunchul Kim, Lea Porsager, Semiconductor, Suzanne Treister, Yu-Chen Wang.
 VÍDEO TRANSLACIONES: MIRADAS X ESPACIOS 13 artistas peruanos, Perú país en ARCOmadrid". Centro Conde Duque, Madrid, Febrero, 2019
 La Ley de la Ventaja Historias y alusiones al deporte y resistencia en el audiovisual peruano (with Jorge Villacorta), Culturaymi Programa Cultural de los Juegos Panamericanos Lima 2019, Museo Metropolitano de Lima, Parque de la Exposición, 2019.

References

Living people
Peruvian scientists
Art curators
Alumni of the London School of Economics
Year of birth missing (living people)